Layla M. is a 2016 Dutch drama film directed by Mijke de Jong. It stars Nora El Koussour as Layla, a young Dutch woman of Moroccan background who rebels against her family and schooling to become an Islamic fundamentalist. As in other films by de Jong, the focus is on a strong-willed young woman growing up. In Layla M., de Jong and her collaborator Jan Eilander wanted to examine the radicalisation of European youngsters. The writers were inspired by a real life account; they wrote the script during the Arab Spring and the trial of Geert Wilders.

The film premiered at the BFI London Film Festival in 2016. The home media reviews were favourable and internationally the film was well-received. At the Netherlands Film Festival, El Koussour won the Golden Calf for Best Actress and Mohammed Azaay won the Golden Calf Award for Best Supporting Actor. The film was selected as the Dutch entry for the Best Foreign Language Film at the 90th Academy Awards, but it was not nominated.

Plot
Layla is a young Dutch Muslim of Moroccan background. She was born and raised in Amsterdam, but faces daily Islamophobia and racism. Whilst her family are happily assimilated into Dutch culture, Layla starts to rebel and to move toward Islamic fundamentalism. She begins to watch and circulate short films she finds on the internet about the situation in Syria and Gaza, deciding to make a film herself, which angers her family. When a ban on wearing burqas is made, this strengthens her resolve to wear one. Layla then meets a young radical called Abdel and decides to marry him. They go to a jihadist training camp in Belgium and narrowly evade the police, before relocating to Amman, the capital city of Jordan. When she lives abroad in a different culture, Layla's radicalism is tested as she struggles to adjust to a patriarchal society and begins to see the hypocrisy of extremism.

Cast
 Nora El Koussour as Layla
 Ilias Addab as Abdel
 Hassan Akkouch as Zine
 Yasemin Cetinkaya as Oum Osama, Layla's neighbor in Jordan
 Husam Chadat as Sheikh Abdullah Al Sabin
 Mohammed Azaay as Layla's father
 Esma Abouzahra as Layla's mother
 Bilal Wahib as Younes, Layla's brother
 Ayisha Siddiqi as Meryem, Layla's best friend
 Sachli Gholamalizad as Senna, the aid worker for the refugee camp

Production
Mijke de Jong has focused upon strong young female characters in films such as Bluebird, Katia's Sister and Joy. In the early 2010s, the radicalisation of European youngsters into Islamic fundamentalists led to around 3000 people (of which 550 were women) travelling to the Middle East to join the Islamic State of Iraq and the Levant (ISIS). Around 220 people travelled from the Netherlands to Iraq and Syria, of which almost half were Moroccan-Dutch. De Jong had been planning to write a script based on her own youthful experiences in the Dutch squatters movement when she had a chance meeting with a Dutch woman who had converted to Islam and married a man who had then undergone a radicalisation process. The couple would sometimes visit Morocco together and on their final trip the man disappeared for several weeks, returning as an Islamic militant who had shaved his beard off as in preparation for a suicide bombing. The young woman divorced her husband and never heard of him again. Her story captivated de Jong, and she and co-writer Jan Eilander changed plans to write the new story instead. They kept elements from de Jong's original plans, since saw the similarities between her experiences and Layla's. These included being adamant about social justice and searching for an identity to belong to. Setting the film in contemporary times allowed the writing team to introduce concepts such as online youth radicalisation and multiculturalism. However, de Jong has commented that "for me, the film isn’t so much about showing a radicalization process, but about a girl with a radical personality." At the time of writing, the Arab Spring was happening and in the Netherlands there was a debate triggered by the trial of Geert Wilders on the charge of inciting hatred against Dutch Moroccans.

Casting director Rebecca van Unen suggested Nora El Koussour to play the main role. El Koussour had recently graduated from a theatre school in Rotterdam. When she enjoyed singing a nasheed with Ilias Addab, de Jong was happy with the chemistry between the actors and decided to cast her. Layla M. was shot completely on location, in Belgium, Germany, Jordan and the Netherlands. It was a co-production between these four countries. The original plan had been to film in Syria, but the outbreak of the Syrian civil war meant that production switched to Jordan.

Layla M. premiered at the BFI London Film Festival in October 2016. Before its screening at the Toronto International Film Festival the film was acquired by BetaFilms for international distribution. The film had a cinematic release in the Netherlands on 17 November 2016. It grossed $71,804 on its opening weekend and took in total $266,010 worldwide. It was released on DVD and Video on demand (VOD) on 27 March 2017.

Critical response 
The Dutch media was enthusiastic about Layla M.. The Algemeen Dagblad called it an "important" story and gave it four stars out of five. De Telegraaf (four stars) praised El Koussour's talent in showing "her character's indomitable spirit" and NRC Handelsblad (four stars) highlighted the "intense acting performance of the two main protagonists".

Internationally, the reviews of the film were generally favourable. Variety noted that the film came at a time when Islamophobia was on the rise in Western Europe and wrote that "El Koussour and Addab share a gentle chemistry that curdles into romantic tragedy". Screen Daily perceived an "intelligent approach to complex matters", highlighting the cinematography of Danny Elsen and El Koussour's star performance. The New York Times found it a "persuasive case study" of radicalisation. The Hollywood Reporter criticised aspects of the film such as the narrative and the development of supporting roles, whilst also praising its topicality and the location work in Jordan.

Accolades
Layla M. was selected as the Dutch entry for the Best Foreign Language Film at the 90th Academy Awards, but was not nominated. It was also nominated for four Golden Calves. Nora El Koussour won the Golden Calf for Best Actress and Mohammed Azaay won the Golden Calf Award for Best Supporting Actor. El Koussour also won the Special Jury prize for outstanding performance at Philadelphia Film Festival. At Filmfest München it won the Fritz Gerlich Prize.

See also
 List of submissions to the 90th Academy Awards for Best Foreign Language Film
 List of Dutch submissions for the Academy Award for Best Foreign Language Film

References

External links
 

2016 films
2016 drama films
2010s Dutch-language films
Dutch drama films
Films directed by Mijke de Jong
Golden Calf winners
Films set in Amsterdam
Films set in Jordan